Franz Koschina (born 2 April 1939) is an Austrian boxer. He competed in the men's welterweight event at the 1960 Summer Olympics.

References

1939 births
Living people
Austrian male boxers
Olympic boxers of Austria
Boxers at the 1960 Summer Olympics
People from Zistersdorf
Sportspeople from Lower Austria
Welterweight boxers
20th-century Austrian people